Asaase Radio is a privately owned radio station in Accra, the capital of Ghana, broadcasting on 99.5 MHz from Cantonments. It began official transmission on 14 June 2020.
Among the shareholders and board members of the company are Gabby Asare Otchere-Darko (chairman; senior partner, Africa Legal Associates), the senior journalist Elizabeth Akua Ohene, the advertising consultant Reginald Daniel Laryea, Nana Adjoa Hackman (managing partner, Africa Legal Associates), Kojo Opoku Agyeman (Professor of Literature at University of Cape Coast), Nkiru Balonwu, Joseph Ofori-Atta and Ebow Brew-Hammond (Africa Legal Associates).
The station operates under the tagline “The Voice of Our Land”.

Programs and Events 
The Asaase Breakfast Show with Kojo Mensah and Nana Yaa Mensah

Sunday Night with Nana Yaa Mensah

Ten-to-One with Caroline Sampson

Between Hours with Naa Ashorkor

Town Hall Talk with Professor Kofi Abotsi

The Forum with Kwaku Agyeman Budu

Asaase Sound Clash

Notable presenters 

 Caroline Sampson
 Kennedy Mornah
 Kojo Mensah 
 Kwaku Sakyi-Addo
 Elvis Crystal 
 Naa Ashorkor Mensah-Doku .

Asaase Sound Clash 
Asaase Radio organized its maiden Asaase Sound Clash on Saturday, September 12, 2020, between the two dancehall rivalries, Shatta Wale and Stonebwoy

References 

Radio stations in Ghana
Greater Accra Region
Mass media in Accra